Podbukovje is a small village in the Municipality of Ivančna Gorica in central Slovenia. It lies on the right bank of the Krka River in the historical region of Lower Carniola. The municipality is now included in the Central Slovenia Statistical Region.

History
Archaeological evidence from the area shows it was settled in prehistoric times.

References

External links

Podbukovje on Geopedia

Populated places in the Municipality of Ivančna Gorica